West Iredell High School is a public high school located in Statesville, North Carolina. It is part of the Iredell-Statesville Schools district.

About 
The students of "West", as it is known throughout the county, are currently 76% Caucasian, 18% African-American, 10% Hispanic, 2% Asian, <1% Multi-Racial, and <1% American Indian.  West offers the standard high school core curriculum.  Since 2004 the school has added three new AP courses, Latin I and II, and nine new honor courses to the curriculum.

Classes
The high school does also offer a full range of visual and performing arts classes; adding pottery to the visual arts program in recent years.  West offers courses in all of the Career Pathways, an Army JROTC program, and an after school Credit Recovery Program.  With the Virtual High School, the students have unlimited course offerings.  West also enjoys a strong partnership with Mitchell Community College where the students can take entry level college courses and Huskins Courses.

Athletics
The school mascot is the Warrior.  They compete in the Northwestern Foothills 3A Conference.  Fall sports include football, cross country, women's tennis, men's soccer, women's golf, and cheerleading.  Winter sports include men's and women's basketball, wrestling, and swimming.  Men's tennis, track & field, softball, baseball, women's soccer, and men's golf are all offered in the spring.

Notable alumni
Jerome Henderson (1987) – former NFL player, current defensive backs coach for the New York Giants

References

External links
West Iredell High School Official Site
NC Career Pathways

Schools in Iredell County, North Carolina
Public high schools in North Carolina